The 2022 Southwestern Athletic Conference baseball tournament will be held place at Regions Field in Birmingham, Alabama from May 25 through 29.  The winner of the tournament will earn the conference's automatic bid to the 2022 NCAA Division I baseball tournament.

Seeding and format
The four eligible teams in each division will be seeded one through four, with the top seed from each division facing the fourth seed from the opposite division in the first round, and so on.  The teams then play a two bracket, double-elimination tournament with a one-game final between the winners of each bracket.

Bracket

Schedule

References

Tournament
Southwestern Athletic Conference Baseball Tournament
Southwestern Athletic Conference baseball tournament
Southwestern Athletic Conference baseball tournament